The Tsybin RSR (Reactivnyy Strategicheskiy Razvedchik, Cyrillic Реактивный Стратегический Разведчик, Russian for "jet strategic reconnaissance") was a Soviet design for an advanced, long-range, Mach 3 strategic reconnaissance aircraft.

Development and design 

In 1954, the design bureau headed by Pavel Tsybin started development of a ramjet-powered supersonic strategic bomber, the RS. This design proved impracticable, and a smaller derivative, the 2RS was proposed, which would achieve intercontinental range by being air-launched from a modified Tupolev Tu-95 bomber.

This too was unsuccessful, with the aircraft unable to return to base if used on an intercontinental mission, while being incapable of carrying a thermonuclear bomb. The design was therefore revised again to a reconnaissance aircraft capable of operating from conventional runways, the RSR. As ramjets could not be used for take-off, they were replaced by turbofans.

The RSR was primarily of aluminium construction, with a long circular-section fuselage, which housed a pressurized cabin for the pilot together with cameras and fuel, with thin, low-aspect-ratio trapezoidal wings. The engines, two Soloviev D-21 turbofans, were mounted at the tips of the wings. The aircraft had a bicycle undercarriage, with outriggers under the engine nacelles.

A simplified, full-sized aerodynamic prototype for the novel layout, the NM-1 was built in 1957. Intended for low-speed handling tests, the NM-1 had a steel-tube fuselage with duraluminium and plywood skinning. This aircraft, powered by two Mikulin AM-5 turbojets first flew on 7 April 1959. Based on the results of these trials, the RSR was redesigned (as the R-020) to make it more manoeuvrable at high altitude (it was proposed to carry out barrel rolls to avoid surface-to-air missiles). More conventional Tumansky R-11 turbojets (the engine used in the MiG-21) replaced the unavailable Soloviev turbofans.  Five R-020 airframes were virtually complete, only awaiting engines by April 1961, with another 10 planned, when Soviet Premier Nikita Khrushchev cancelled the program.

Specifications (R-020)

See also

References

Notes

Bibliography

 Butowski, Piotr. "Steps Towards 'Blackjack': Soviet supersonic intercontinental bombers before the Tu-144". Air Enthusiast. No. 73, January - February 1998. Stamford, Lincolnshire: Key Publishing. Page 36-49.  .
 Gunston, Bill. The Osprey Encyclopedia of Russian Aircraft 1875 - 1995. London: Osprey, 1995. .
 "Plane Facts:Soviet strategic reconnaissance". Air International, February 1977, Vol 12 No 2. Bromley, UK:Fine Scroll. p. 98.

External links
Tsybin RSR
Tsybin NM-1
 Clip  Tsybin  NM-1
Clip Tsybin  NM-1

1960s Soviet military reconnaissance aircraft
Abandoned military aircraft projects of the Soviet Union
Twinjets
Aircraft first flown in 1959